Mudke Dhariwal , is a town and Union Council of Kasur District in the Punjab province of Pakistan. It is part of Kasur Tehsil and is located at 31°15'4N 74°3'52E with an altitude of 196 metres (646 feet). The village belongs to the HASHMI tribe of the Dhariwal.

References

Kasur District